Owch Bolagh (also Romanized as Owch Bolāgh and Ūch Bolāgh; also known as Uch-Bulag, Ūchbūlāgh, and Uchbulāq) is a village in Qareh Poshtelu-e Bala Rural District, Qareh Poshtelu District, Zanjan County, Zanjan Province, Iran. At the 2006 census, its population was 223, in 54 families.

References 

Populated places in Zanjan County